1996 census may refer to:

 Canada 1996 Census
 South African National Census of 1996